Guazi is a Chinese e-commerce company that provides consumer-to-consumer services via its web portal for buying and selling used cars. As of October 2017, it was among the most popular used car platforms in South East China, including Shenzhen and Guangdong. The company and its website cater only to people who can read and write Chinese.

History
Guazi commenced its operations in 2014 in Beijing as a start up, and went public in 2016.

In June 2017, the company secured $400 million U.S. in a Series B financing round which was led by a $100 million U.S. investment from Sequoia Capital China.

Operations
Guazi provides services for people residing in most tier 1 and 2 Chinese cities including Beijing, Shanghai, Shenzhen, Guangzhou, Hangzhou and Nanjing. As of July 2017, its network covered 200 cities in China, across 30 provinces.

Guazi is operated by a company called Chehaoduo (车好多). Chehaoduo operates Guazi (瓜子二手车), as well as Maodou (毛豆新车网), a new car eCommerce platform. In July 2017, Guazi and Tencent offered a car leasing option, via Tencent's social media and mobile payment app WeChat.

References 

Online marketplaces of China
Online automotive companies
Internet properties established in 2014
Companies based in Beijing
Used car market